Chukwuemeka "Emeka" Osita Onwuamaegbu (born 1959) is a retired Nigerian Army major general who served as the 25th commandant of the Nigerian Defence Academy from 2010 to 2013.

Early life

Major General Onwuamaegbu is the son of Obumneme G. Onwuamaegbu, who was the attorney general of East Central State and the nephew of journalist Joseph Egemonye.

Military career

He was admitted to the Nigerian Defence Academy on 3 January 1977 as a member of the 21st Regular Combatant Course where he was coursemates with officers such as Alex Sabundu Badeh and Babagana Monguno. He was commissioned a Second lieutenant on 3 July 1979.

He was promoted to major general in 2009. Prior to commanding the Defence Academy, he served as commandant of the Nigerian Army Peacekeeping Center, Jaji and was director of Army Public Relations.

References 

Nigerian generals
Nigerian Army officers
Nigerian Defence Academy people
Nigerian Defence Academy Commandants
1959 births
Living people